Ivanovsky District is the name of several administrative and municipal districts in Russia:
Ivanovsky District, Amur Oblast, an administrative and municipal district of Amur Oblast
Ivanovsky District, Ivanovo Oblast, an administrative and municipal district of Ivanovo Oblast

See also
Ivanovsky (disambiguation)
Ivanovskoye District, a district of Eastern Administrative Okrug of Moscow
Ivanivka Raion (disambiguation), two raions (districts) in Ukraine

References